The following is a list of notable deaths in May 2003.

Entries for each day are listed alphabetically by surname. A typical entry lists information in the following sequence:
 Name, age, country of citizenship at birth, subsequent country of citizenship (if applicable), reason for notability, cause of death (if known), and reference.

May 2003

1
Wim van Est, 80, Dutch racing cyclist.
Miss Elizabeth, 42, American professional wrestler and wrestling manager, drug and alcohol overdose.
Paul Moore Jr., 83, American bishop of the Episcopal Church and former United States Marine Corps officer.

2
Konstantin Buteyko, 80, Russian physician.
Mohammed Dib, 82, Algerian writer.
James Miller, 34, Welsh filmmaker and cameraman, killed by Israel Defense Forces (IDF) gunfire.
Laurence O'Keeffe, 71, British diplomat.
Maureen Rooney, 56, Scottish trade unionist.
Henry Wise Jr., 82, American physician and World War II Tuskegee Airman fighter pilot.
George Wyle, 87, American musical director and composer (theme to Gilligan's Island, "It's the Most Wonderful Time of the Year").

3
José Alanís, 92, Mexican sports shooter (men's 25 metre rapid fire pistol at the 1948 Summer Olympics).
Lucy Barfield, 67, British godchild of C.S. Lewis and eponym for Lucy Pevensie from The Chronicles of Narnia.
Anna Buckley, 79, American politician, complications of cancer and pneumonia.
Glen Culler, 75, American professor of electrical engineering.
Oskar D'Amico, 80, Italian artist.
Jozef Feranec, 93, Slovak Roman Catholic bishop, Diocese of Banská Bystrica (1973–1990).
Suzy Parker, 70, American actress and model, wife of Bradford Dillman.
Marcel Roche, 82, French physician and scientist.
G. Venkateswaran, 55, Indian film producer.

4
Barbara Bailey, 92, English nun, artist and teacher, created the artwork for Royal Doulton Bunnykins tableware.
Skunder Boghossian, 65, Ethiopian-American artist and teacher.
Sesto Bruscantini, 83, Italian baritone.
Susan B. Nelson, 76, American environmental activist, "mother of the Santa Monica Mountains National Recreation Area".
Arthur Oldham, 76, British composer and choirmaster.
Sir Richard Trowbridge, 83, British admiral and Governor of Western Australia (1980–1983).
Gloster Udy, 84, Australian religious minister and author.
David Woodley, 44, American gridiron football player (Miami Dolphins), starting quarterback in Super Bowl XVII, complications due to kidney and liver failure.

5
Sam Bockarie, 38, Sierra Leonean politician and army commander, gunshot wound.
David Lewin, 69, American music theorist.
Sir Philip Powell, 82, British architect.
Walter Sisulu, 90, South African anti-apartheid activist and ANC member.

6
Ateng, 60, Indonesian actor and comedian.
Steve Atkinson, 54, Canadian ice hockey player (Buffalo Sabres, Washington Capitals, Toronto Toros), heart attack.
Geoffrey Bardon, 63, Australian artist, teacher and Aboriginal art advocate.
Oleksandr Bilash, 72, Ukrainian composer and author.
Colin Gunton, 62, British theologian and Professor of Christian Doctrine.
Jocelyn Herbert, 86, British stage designer.
Art Houtteman, 75, American baseball player (Detroit Tigers, Cleveland Indians, Baltimore Orioles).

7
P. B. Abercrombie, 85, British writer.
Denise Albe-Fessard, 87, French neuroscientist, president of the International Association for the Study of Pain.
Duane Allen, 65, American professional football player (Santa Ana College, Los Angeles Rams, Chicago Bears).
Johan Andersen, 83, Danish sprint canoer (silver medal in men's K-1 1000 metres at the 1948 Summer Olympics).
John A. Collins, 71, United States Air Force chaplain.
Gerónimo Lluberas, 47, Puerto Rican physician,  writer and composer, cancer.
Joshua Madaki, 55, Nigerian Governor of Bauchi State, car crash.
George Morrow, 69, American computer scientist and pioneer, aplastic anemia.

8
Slick Coffman, 92, American baseball player (Detroit Tigers, St. Louis Browns).
Dorothy Ferguson, 80, Canadian-American baseball infielder and outfielder, cancer.
Sam Lacy, 99, American sportswriter, reporter, and television/radio commentator.
Jack Null, 78, American college basketball coach (Virginia Military Institute), complications from an aneurysm.
Elvira Pagã, 82, Brazilian vedette, actress, singer, writer and painter.

9
Yves Brouzet, 54, French shot putter (four-time French champion; men's Olympic shot put: 1972, 1976).
Jack Gelber, 71, American playwright (The Connection), leukemia.
Sir George Grenfell-Baines, 95, British architect and town planner.
Antonio Ibáñez Freire, 89, Spanish politician and army officer.
Russell B. Long, 84, American politician (U.S. Senator from Louisiana from 1948 to 1987).
Elizabeth Neuffer, 46, American journalist, specialized in war crimes, human rights abuses and post-conflict societies, car accident in Iraq.

10
Norman Berlis, 83, Canadian diplomat.
Bob Gaudio, 77, American football player (Ohio State University, Cleveland Browns).
Leonard Michaels, 70, American writer of short stories, novels, and essays.
Milan Vukcevich, 66, Yugoslav-born American chemist and Grandmaster of Chess Composition.
Joseph D. Ward, 89, American politician.

11
Cecil Allan, 88, Northern Irish footballer.
Karl Boyes, 67, American politician (Pennsylvania House of Representatives).
Loren McIntyre, 86, American photojournalist.
Noel Redding, 57, English former bassist for The Jimi Hendrix Experience, liver cirrhosis.
Ernie Toshack, 88, Australian cricketer.
Bill Vickroy, 81, American football coach and athletic director (University of Wisconsin–La Crosse), and president of NAIA.

12
Prince Sadruddhin Aga Khan, 70, French international civil servant (U.N. High Commissioner for Refugees 1965–1977).
Stan Lay, 96, New Zealand javelin thrower (men's javelin throw at the 1928 Summer Olympics).
Edward McCombie McGirr, 86, Scottish medical academic.
Sir Michael Richardson, 78, British investment banker.
Don Ryder, Baron Ryder of Eaton Hastings, 86, British businessman and politician.
Jeremy Sandford, 72, British screenwriter.

13
Vladimir Abazarov, 73, Soviet geologist.
Theo Aronson, 73, South African-British royal biographer (Princess Alice, Queen Mother, Princess Margaret).
Robert Kost, 66, Canadian artist.
John Savage, 70, Canadian politician; former Premier of Nova Scotia, cancer.
Byron Wolford, 72, American rodeo cowboy and professional poker player.

14
Dave DeBusschere, 62, American professional basketball player (Detroit Pistons, New York Knicks), coach (Detroit Pistons) and baseball player (Chicago White Sox).
Otto Edelmann, 86, Austrian operatic bass.
Dame Wendy Hiller, 91, Oscar-winning British actress of stage and screen (I Know Where I'm Going!).
Minarni, 59, Indonesian badminton player.
Robert Stack, 84, American film and television actor.

15
D. Bernard Amos, 80, American immunologist, contributed to immunogenetics, tumor immunity and transplantation immunology.
June Carter Cash, 73, American musician, singer, wife of Johnny Cash, complications following heart-valve replacement surgery.
Sir Desmond Dreyer, 93, British admiral.
Stanley B. Kimball, 76, American historian.
Gaby Robert, 83, French football player.
Rik Van Steenbergen, 78, Belgian cyclist.

16
William Charles Anderson, 83, American writer (novel and film adaptation: Bat*21).
Mark McCormack, 72, sports business pioneer, founder of IMG.
B. R. Murty, 75, Indian botanist and geneticist.
Stan Rofe, 69, Australian disc jockey and music news reporter, cancer.
Boris Stavrev, 68, Bulgarian Olympic fencer.

17
Edith Carlmar, 91, Norwegian actress and Norway's first female film director.
Sidney Holgate, 84, British mathematician and academic administrator.
Edwin L. Nelson, 63, American judge (U.S. District Judge of the U.S. District Court for the Northern District of Alabama).
Luigi Pintor, 77, Italian politician and journalist.
Gerhard Schöpfel, 90, German pilot in the Luftwaffe during World War II.
Gerard Maxwell Weisberg, 77, American judge (New York State Supreme Court).

18
Peter Lasko, 79, German-born British art historian.
Anna Santisteban, 88, advisor of Miss Puerto Rico titleholders for the Miss Universe contest.
Barb Tarbox, 42, Canadian anti-smoking activist, brain cancer and lung cancer.
George H. Williams, 85, American President of American University.

19
Jim Bradley, 91, British army officer and World War II prisoner of war escapee.
Johanna Budwig, 94, German biochemist and author.
Camoflauge, 21, American rapper, shot.
Pip Freedman, 77, South African radio comedian and actor, blood clot in his leg.
Ludwig Lachner, German footballer and manager.
Jinny Osborn, 76, American popular music singer, cancer.
Kunhiraman Palat Candeth, 86, Indian army general.
Nicolay Paskevich, 95, Russian painter.
Ivo Žídek, 76, Czech operatic tenor, known for his roles in the operas of Smetana, Dvořák and Janáček.

20
Joe "Guitar" Hughes, 65, American blues musician, heart attack.
Tha. Kiruttinan, 66, Indian politician, murdered.
Eddie Little, 48, American author, heart attack.
Howard Sims, 86, African-American vaudeville tap dancer, alzheimer's disease.

21
Alejandro de Tomaso, 74, Argentinian racing driver and industrialist.
Hermann A. Haus, 77, Slovene-born American scientist.
Roy Keenan, 72, Canadian Olympic boxer 
George C. Martin, 93, American Boeing project engineer (Boeing B-29 Superfortress, Boeing B-47 Stratojet).
Philip W. Nuber, 63, American U.S. Air Force major general, director of the Defense Mapping Agency.
Frank D. White, 69, American politician (41st Governor of Arkansas), banker and banking regulator.

22
Elias Constantine, 91, Trinidadian cricketer.
Big DS, 31, American hardcore rapper and record producer, lymphatic cancer.
Grover E. Murray, 86, American geologist and educator.
Noel Robins, 67, Australian partially quadriplegic sailor, traffic accident.

23
Dame Diana Collins, 95, British human rights activist, widow of Canon John Collins.
David Eagleson, 78, American lawyer.
Weenie Miller, American  basketball coach, director, and sportcaster.
Roy Tackett, 78, rifleman with the United States Marine Corps during World War II, heart failure.
Jean Yanne, 69, French actor and director (Weekend, This Man Must Die).

24
Rachel Kempson, 92, English actress, stroke.
Allan McMahon, 48, Australian rugby footballer and coach.
Arne Skouen, 89, Norwegian journalist, author and film director.
Ruth G. Waddy, 94, American artist, printmaker and activist.
Sir Robert Williams, 86, Welsh microbiologist and epidemiologist, leading research on hospital-acquired infections.

25
Almir Chediak, 52, Brazilian musician and entrepreneur, shot by robbers.
Richard A. Gardner, 72, American child psychiatrist.
George Edward Lynch, 86, American Roman Catholic prelate, Auxiliary Bishop of Raleigh.
Bill Paschal, 81, American football player (Georgia Tech, New York Giants, Boston Yanks).
Joseph A. Smith, 91, American politician.
Jeremy Ward, 27, American keyboardist and sound technician, member of The Mars Volta and De Facto, heroin overdose.
Sloan Wilson, 83, American novelist (The Man in the Gray Flannel Suit, A Summer Place).

26
Charles Brahm, 85, Belgian canoeist (men's kayak doubles 10000 metres at the 1936 Summer Olympics).
Alfredo Bravo, 78, Argentine politician and trade unionist.
Melitta Brunner, 96, Austrian figure skater (ladies singles skating, bronze medal in pairs skating at the 1928 Winter Olympics).
Jim Root, 71, American football player (Miami University, Chicago Cardinals) and coach (New Hampshire, William & Mary).
Kathleen Winsor, 83, American author (Forever Amber).

27
Geoffrey Bawa, 83, Sri Lankan architect, one of the most influential Asian architects of his generation.
Luciano Berio, 77, Italian composer (Sinfonia).
Verdi Boyer, 91, American professional football player (UCLA, Brooklyn Dodgers).
Mac Colville, 87, Canadian ice hockey player (New York Rangers).
Al Hartley, 81, American comic book writer-artist.
Robert Wesley Knighton, 62, American serial killer, execution by lethal injection.
Ensio Koivunen, 72, Finnish serial killer.

28
Janet Collins, 86, American ballerina.
Oleg Grigoryevich Makarov, 70, Soviet cosmonaut (Soyuz 12, Soyuz 18a, Soyuz 27, Soyuz 26, Soyuz T-3) and rocket scientist.
Dorothy Nelkin, 69, American sociologist of science and author, chronicled the relationship between science and society.
Ilya Prigogine, 86, Russian-Belgian physical chemist, 1977 Nobel Prize winner in chemistry.
Martha Scott, 90, American stage, film and television actress.

29
W. R. (Red) Alford, 65, American mathematician, worked in the field of number theory.
Savita Ambedkar, 94, Indian social activist and doctor.
Tas Bull, 71, Australian trade union leader (Waterside Workers' Federation of Australia).
Trevor Ford, 79, Welsh international footballer.
Jack Freeman, 84, American football coach.
David Jefferies, 30, British motorcycle racer, motorcycle crash.
Basil Langton, 91,  English actor, director and photographer.
Pierre Restany, 72, French art critic and cultural philosopher.
Wallace Terry, 65, American journalist and oral historian.

30
Minoru Mochizuki, 96, Japanese martial artist.
Mickie Most, 64, English record producer, peritoneal mesothelioma.
John Roberts, 75, British historian and broadcaster.
Silvester Sabolčki, 23, Croatian footballer, car crash.
Jason Sweeney, 16, American construction worker, murdered.
Jay Waldman, 58, American judge (U.S. District Judge of the U.S. District Court for the Eastern District of Pennsylvania).

31
Janine Bazin, 80, French film and television producer.
Anil Biswas, 88, Indian film music director, scored music for more than 100 films.
Li Lin, 79, Chinese physicist.
Anthony Stodart, Baron Stodart of Leaston, 86, Scottish politician and life peer.
Billy Wade, 88, South African cricketer.

References 

2003-05
05